Sta. Lucia Land, Inc. is a real estate development company based in the Philippines. The firm serves as the real estate arm of the conglomerate, Sta. Lucia Group

History
The company was incorporated on December 6, 1966 under the name Zipporah Mining and Industrial Corporation to engage in mining. The company became listed in the Philippine Stock Exchange on September 14, 1987. The company's primary business was changed to real estate development and the corporate name was changed to Zipporah Realty Holdings, Inc. on August 14, 1996.  In 2007, Sta. Lucia Realty and Development Corporation acquired majority control of the company. The corporate name was changed to Sta. Lucia Land, Inc. (SLLI) on July 16, 2007. As a result, SLLI became a public company via reverse merger.

On December 22, 2015, SLLI became listed in the Philippine Dealing Exchange Corp. ("PDEx"). SLLI joined the PDEx community of listed corporations, with its listing of P3 Billion worth of fixed-rate Peso bonds with an over-subscription option of up to P2 Billion in the PDEx platform. This marks the maiden listing of SLI in the Philippine Bond Market. The Bonds have been rated AA+ by the Credit Rating and Investor Services Philippines, Inc.

Developments
As of 2021, the Sta. Lucia Group has over 250 real estate projects in the Philippines. Sta. Lucia has developed residential developments in various places in the Philippines including Bulacan, Cavite, Laguna, Palawan, Pampanga, Pangasinan, Nueva Ecija in Luzon; Cebu, Iloilo, and Bacolod in the Visayas and in Davao in Mindanao. Among Sta. Lucia's projects include residential subdivisions and condominiums, hotels, golf courses, and shopping centers.

Sports
Sta. Lucia has organized professional basketball and volleyball names under its brand. It had a team in the Philippine Basketball Association which played under the name Sta. Lucia Realtors until 2010 when the company sold its franchise to Meralco. It has also played in the Pilipinas Commercial Basketball League and the Philippine Basketball League. Sta. Lucia also sponsored the Pasig Pirates, which was renamed as the Pasig Sta. Lucia Realtors, of the Maharlika Pilipinas Basketball League.

It also maintains a women's volleyball team, the Sta. Lucia Lady Realtors which played in the Philippine Super Liga and competes in the Premier Volleyball League.

Notes

References

External links

Companies of the Philippines
Real estate companies established in 1972
Real estate companies of the Philippines
Companies listed on the Philippine Stock Exchange
Companies based in Rizal
Philippine companies established in 1972